Midnight Manhunt is a 1945 film noir crime film mystery directed by William C. Thomas and written by David Lang. The film premiered on July 24, 1945 and is in the public domain.

The film stars William Gargan, Ann Savage, Leo Gorcey and George Zucco.

Plot
Midnight Manhunt begins with the shooting death of a master criminal who expires in a wax museum. Reporter Sue Gallagher (Ann Savage) is first on the scene, but she is soon in competition with her boyfriend, fellow reporter Pete Willis (William Gargan). The killer traps Sue in the wax museum when he returns there looking for the body. Leo Gorcey plays the caretaker of the wax museum.

Cast
William Gargan as Pete Willis
Ann Savage as Sue Gallagher
Leo Gorcey as Clutch Tracy
George Zucco as Jelke
Paul Hurst as Murphy
Don Beddoe as Det. Lt. Max Hurley
Charles Halton as Henry Miggs
George E. Stone as Joe Wells

Production
The film was known as Cheese It, Corpse.

See also
 List of films in the public domain in the United States

References

External links
 
 
Review at Variety

1945 films
1940s crime films
American black-and-white films
American crime films
American mystery films
Films directed by William C. Thomas
1940s English-language films
1940s American films